In digital circuits, a runt pulse is a narrow pulse that, 
due to non-zero rise and fall times of the signal, does not reach a valid 
high or low level.  A runt pulse may occur when switching between 
asynchronous clocks; or as the result of a race condition in which a signal takes two separate paths through a circuit, which may have different delays, and is then recombined to form a glitch; or when the output of a flip-flop becomes metastable.

Example 
Some oscilloscopes provide a method for triggering on runt pulses.  The oscilloscope triggers when the signal crosses one of two voltage thresholds, but not both.

References 

Digital electronics